"Vera" is a song by Pink Floyd which appears on their 1979 album, The Wall.

Title
The title is a reference to Vera Lynn, a British singer who came to prominence during World War II with her popular song "We'll Meet Again". 

The song's intro features a collage of superimposed audio excerpts from the 1969 film Battle of Britain. Among the used clips are a piece of dialogue ("Where the hell are you, Simon?"), a BBC broadcast and battle sound effects.

Personnel
Roger Waters – vocals
David Gilmour – acoustic guitar, bass guitar
Richard Wright – Prophet-5 synthesiser

with:

New York Symphony Orchestra

Personnel per Fitch and Mahon.

Further reading
 Fitch, Vernon. The Pink Floyd Encyclopedia (3rd edition), 2005. .

See also
 List of anti-war songs

References

1979 songs
Pink Floyd songs
Songs written by Roger Waters
Song recordings produced by Bob Ezrin
Song recordings produced by David Gilmour
Song recordings produced by Roger Waters
Anti-war songs
Songs about World War II
Songs about musicians
Cultural depictions of British women
Cultural depictions of pop musicians
Cultural depictions of folk musicians